The 2020 CFL Draft took place on April 30, 2020 at 8:00 pm ET and was broadcast on TSN and RDS. 73 players were chosen from among eligible players from Canadian Universities across the country, as well as Canadian players playing in the NCAA. This was the second year in a row that featured territorial picks after they were re-introduced in the 2019 CFL Draft.

The draft was broadcast live on TSN for two hours and then subsequent coverage shifted to digital platforms on CFL.ca. Due to the ongoing COVID-19 pandemic, every commentator broadcast from remote locations as opposed to in-studio. The TSN production was hosted by Farhan Lalji and featured the CFL on TSN panel which included Dave Naylor, Duane Forde, and Davis Sanchez. Randy Ambrosie, the CFL commissioner, delivered an opening remark and each selection in the first two rounds was announced by Lalji. Once the TSN production finished, CFL.ca host, Brodie Lawson, and CFL.ca columnist, Marshall Ferguson, covered all remaining rounds via an online broadcast on CFL.ca.

Top prospects
Source: CFL Scouting Bureau rankings.

Trades
In the explanations below, (D) denotes trades that took place during the draft, while (PD) indicates trades completed pre-draft.

Round one
 Montreal → Hamilton (PD). Montreal traded this selection, Jamaal Westerman, Chris Williams, and a first-round pick in the 2021 CFL Draft to Hamilton in exchange for Johnny Manziel, Tony Washington, and Landon Rice.
 Winnipeg → Toronto (PD). Winnipeg traded a conditional first-round pick and a third-round selection in this year's draft to Toronto in exchange for Zach Collaros and a fifth-round pick in this year's draft. The condition was set upon Collaros re-signing with Winnipeg which was fulfilled on January 27, 2020 when he signed a two-year contract with the Blue Bombers.
 Ottawa → Calgary (PD). Ottawa traded the first overall selection to Calgary in exchange for the sixth overall selection when Nick Arbuckle signed a contract extension with Ottawa after his playing rights were traded by Calgary.
 Calgary ←→ BC (D). Calgary traded the first overall selection and 15th overall selection to BC in exchange for the third overall selection and 12th overall selection.

Round two
 Saskatchewan → Montreal (PD). Saskatchewan traded this selection and Joshua Stanford to Montreal in exchange for Philip Blake and Patrick Lavoie.
 BC ←→ Calgary (D). BC traded the 12th overall selection and third overall selection to Calgary in exchange for the first overall selection and 15th overall selection.

Round three
 Toronto → Montreal (PD). Toronto traded this selection and T. J. Heath to Montreal in exchange for Ryan Bomben and a fifth-round pick in this year's draft. 
 Winnipeg → Toronto (PD). Winnipeg traded this selection and a conditional first-round pick to Toronto in exchange for Zach Collaros and a fifth-round pick in this year's draft.
 Ottawa → Calgary (PD). Ottawa traded this selection and a conditional first-round pick in this year's draft to Calgary in exchange for Nick Arbuckle and a conditional first-round pick in this year's draft.

Round four
 Toronto → Saskatchewan (PD). Toronto traded this selection to Saskatchewan in exchange for Zach Collaros. The pick can be upgraded to as high as a second-round pick in this year's draft if Collaros meets playing time targets and extension clauses. 
 BC → Calgary (PD). BC traded a conditional fourth-round selection (which was fulfilled) and a negotiation list player to Calgary in exchange for Justin Renfrow and a fifth-round pick in this year's draft.

Round five
 Montreal → Toronto (PD). Montreal traded this selection and Ryan Bomben to Toronto in exchange for T. J. Heath and a third-round pick in this year's draft. 
 Calgary → BC (PD). Calgary traded this selection and Justin Renfrow to BC in exchange for a conditional fourth-round pick in this year's draft and a negotiation list player.
 Toronto → Winnipeg (PD). Toronto traded this selection and Zach Collaros to Winnipeg in exchange for a third-round pick in this year's draft and a conditional draft pick that is contingent on Collaros re-signing with the Blue Bombers.

Round six
 BC → Montreal (PD). BC traded a conditional sixth-round selection (which was fulfilled) in this year's draft and a second-round selection in the 2019 CFL Draft to Montreal in exchange for Tyrell Sutton and a third-round pick in the 2019 CFL Draft.

Round seven
 Toronto → Edmonton (PD). Toronto traded a conditional sixth-round selection (which became a seventh-round selection) and Martese Jackson to Edmonton in exchange for a third-round pick in the 2019 CFL Draft.

Round eight
 Toronto → Montreal (PD). Toronto traded a conditional eighth-round selection to Montreal in exchange for Boseko Lokombo.

Conditional trades
 Montreal → Saskatchewan (PD). Montreal traded a conditional eighth-round selection to Saskatchewan in exchange for Spencer Moore. 
 BC → Toronto (PD). BC traded a conditional eighth-round selection and Davon Coleman to Toronto in exchange for Shawn Lemon.

Forfeitures
 Saskatchewan forfeited their third-round pick after selecting Jake Bennett in the 2019 Supplemental Draft.

Draft order

Round one

Round two

Round three

Round four

Round five

Round six

Round seven

Round eight

References

Canadian College Draft
2020 in Canadian football